"Cherry" (also known as "Clipped/Galaxy") is Curve's third single/EP. It was released on 28 October 1991 and it reached #36 in the UK singles chart. All four songs from the EP were included in the compilation Pubic Fruit, issued in 1992.

Track listing

12" & CD
"Clipped" – 4:10
"Die Like a Dog" – 4:37
"Galaxy" – 3:54
"Cherry" – 5:49

7" & MC
"Clipped" – 4:10
"Galaxy" – 3:54

10"
"Clipped" – 4:10
"Die Like a Dog" – 4:37
"Galaxy" – 3:54
"Cherry" – 5:01
"I Speak Your Every Word" (with JC 001) – 4:38

Music video
The video for "Clipped" features the members of the band performing this song in a house.

Credits
 Written by Toni Halliday and Dean Garcia
 Produced by Curve and Steve Osborne
 Recorded at Todal by Curve
 Additional recording at Eastcote Studios
 Additional engineering by Ingo Vauk
 Mixed by Alan Moulder at the Church, assisted by Dick Meenhey
 Design & photography by Flat Earth

References

1991 EPs
Curve (band) EPs